Lower Jaw Glacier is the south branch of the glacier on the eastern side of the ridge running north from Shark Fin, a peak in Antarctica. The branch flows eastward and converges with Upper Jaw Glacier before entering Renegar Glacier, Royal Society Range. It was so named by the New Zealand Geographic Board in 1994 as, on a map, the combined shapes of the Upper and Lower Jaw Glaciers resemble a gaping mouth, an idea strengthened by the proximity of Shark Fin.

References

Glaciers of Dufek Coast